Ronald Stade (born Berlin, Germany, 1953) is a Swedish anthropologist. He is best known for his writings on cosmopolitanism and conceptual history. His fieldwork in Guam resulted in a book-length ethnography called Pacific Passages: World Culture and Local Politics in Guam (1998).

Ronald Stade is professor of peace and conflict studies with specialization in anthropology at Malmö University. He has been affiliated to Stockholm University, the Swedish Collegium for Advanced Study, and Hitotsubashi University in Tokyo.

References 
Pacific Passages: World Culture and Local Politics in Guam. .

External links 
 IMROST

1953 births
Living people
Swedish anthropologists
Social anthropologists
Academic staff of Stockholm University
Academic staff of Malmö University